The Treason Act 1351 is an Act of the Parliament of England which codified and curtailed the common law offence of treason. No new offences were created by the statute. It is one of the earliest English statutes still in force, although it has been very significantly amended. It was extended to Ireland in 1495 and to Scotland in 1708. The Act was passed at Westminster in the Hilary term of 1351, in the 25th year of the reign of Edward III and was entitled "A Declaration which Offences shall be adjudged Treason". It was passed to clarify precisely what was treason, as the definition under common law had been expanded rapidly by the courts until its scope was controversially wide. The Act was last used to prosecute William Joyce in 1945 for collaborating with Germany in World War II.

The Act is still in force in the United Kingdom. It is also still in force in some former British colonies, including New South Wales. Like other laws of the time, it was written in Norman French.

The Act is the origin of the definition of treason in the United States (in Article III of the Constitution). Joseph Story wrote in his Commentaries on the Constitution of the United States that:

Origin
Until 1351 treason was defined by the common law. The king's judges gradually expanded the scope of treason under the pretext that any "assortment of royal power", by which was meant doing anything which only the king (or his officers) could legally do, was considered treason – even hunting deer in the king's forests. When in 1348, Sir John Gerberge of Royston was convicted of treason for falsely imprisoning William de Boletisford and taking his horse, until he paid him £90 (approximately ), the barons compelled Edward III to agree to an Act of Parliament to restrict the definition of treason to definite limits.

Joseph Story wrote: "This statute has ever since remained the pole star of English jurisprudence upon this subject."

Content
The Act distinguished two varieties of treason: high treason and petty treason (or petit treason), the first being disloyalty to the Sovereign, and the second being disloyalty to a subject. The practical distinction was the consequence of being convicted: for a high treason, the penalty was death by hanging, drawing and quartering (for a man) or drawing and burning (for a woman), and the traitor's property would escheat to the Crown; in the case of a petty treason the penalty was drawing and hanging without quartering, or burning without drawing; and property escheated only to the traitor's immediate lord.

The forfeiture provisions were repealed by the Forfeiture Act 1870, and the penalty was reduced to life imprisonment by the Crime and Disorder Act 1998.

A person was guilty of high treason under the Act if they:

"compassed or imagined" (i.e. planned; the original Norman French is "fait compasser ou ymaginer") the death of the king, his wife or his eldest son and heir (following the coming into force of the Succession to the Crown Act 2013 on 26 March 2015, this has effect as if the reference were to the eldest child and heir);
violated the king's companion, the king's eldest daughter if she was unmarried or the wife of the king's eldest son and heir (following the coming into force of the Succession to the Crown Act 2013, this has effect as if the reference were to the eldest son only if he is also the heir);
levied war against the king in his realm;
adhered to the king's enemies in his realm, giving them aid and comfort in his realm or elsewhere;
counterfeited the Great Seal or the Privy Seal (repealed and re-enacted in the Forgery Act 1830; death penalty abolished in 1832; reduced to felony in 1861 (except in Scotland));
counterfeited English coinage or imported counterfeit English coinage (reduced to felony in 1832);
killed the Chancellor, Treasurer (this office has long been vacant), one of the king's justices (either of the King's Bench or the Common Pleas), a justice in eyre, an assize judge, and "all other Justices", while they are performing their offices. (This did not include the barons of the Exchequer.)

The penalty for counterfeiting coins was the same as for petty treason. The offence had previously been called petty treason, before the Act elevated it to high treason.

Under the Act petty treason was the murder of one's lawful superior: that is if a servant killed his master or his master's wife, a wife killed her husband or a clergyman killed his prelate. This offence was abolished in 1828.

The Act originally envisaged that further forms of treason would arise that would not be covered by the Act, so it legislated for this possibility. The words from "et pr ceo q plusurs auts cases de semblable treson" onwards have been translated as:

The Act in Scotland
Following the union of England and Scotland by the Acts of Union 1707, Scotland continued to have its own treason laws until the Treason Act 1708 abolished Scottish treason law and extended English treason law to Scotland. This Act also made it treason to counterfeit the Great Seal of Scotland, and to kill the Scottish Lords of Session and Lords of Justiciary (in addition to forging the British – formerly English – seal, and killing English judges). However while in England and Ireland forgery of the seal of Great Britain ceased to be treason under the Forgery Act 1861, this Act did not apply to Scotland. Also, forging the Scottish seal is still treason in Scotland, but has not been treason in England or Ireland since 1861.

The 1351 Act still applies in Scotland today, and is a reserved matter which the Scottish Parliament has no power to modify.

Interpretation

Although the first kind of treason is described as "compassing", the offence does not consist of purely thinking. A subsequent clause which requires that an "overt act" must also be proven has been held by judges to apply to all kinds of treason.

Adhering to "enemies" does not include adhering to rebels or pirates.

During the trial of Roger Casement, who in 1916 was accused of collaborating with Germany during World War I, the defence argued that the Act applied only to activities carried out on British soil, while Casement had committed the acts of collaboration outside Britain. However, closer reading of the originally unpunctuated medieval document allowed for a broader interpretation, leading to the accusation by his supporters that Casement was "hanged by a comma". The court decided that a comma should be read in the text, crucially widening the sense so that "in the realm or elsewhere" meant where acts were done and not just where the "King's enemies" might be.

Repeals

The clauses about forgery and counterfeiting were repealed in 1830 and 1832. The clause beginning "et pr ceo q plusurs" was repealed by the Statute Law Revision Act 1948. The clause beginning "Et si per cas" (clarifying that robbery and kidnapping were not treason) was repealed by the Criminal Law Act 1967 and the Criminal Law Act (Northern Ireland) 1967.

The Act was repealed in the Republic of Ireland on 16 May 1983, and in New Zealand on 1 January 1962.

See also
Treason
High treason in the United Kingdom
Treason Act
Treason Act 1495 (special defence to treason)
Treason Act 1695 (statute of limitations)
Treason Act 1702 (further form of treason)
Treason Act 1708 (further forms of treason)
Treason Act 1814 (the penalty for treason)
Treason Felony Act 1848 (still-existing offences which used to be treason)

Notes

References

External links
The Treason Act 1351, as amended, from Legislation.gov.uk.
 Complete original Norman French text, with translation

Acts of the Parliament of England
Acts of the Parliament of England still in force
1350s in law
1351 in England
English criminal law
Treason in England
Money forgery
Edward III of England